Lucerapex laevicarinata is a species of sea snail, a marine gastropod mollusk in the family Turridae, the turrids.

Description
The length of the shell attains 12.6 mm.

Distribution
This marine species occurs off New Caledonia

References

 Kantor Yu.I., Fedosov A.E. & Puillandre N. (2018). New and unusual deep-water Conoidea revised with shell, radula and DNA characters. Ruthenica. 28(2): 47-82.

External links
 

laevicarinata
Gastropods described in 2018